The Tula–Waja, or Tula–Wiyaa languages are a branch of the provisional Savanna languages, closest to Kam (Nyingwom), spoken in northeastern Nigeria. They are spoken primarily in southeastern Gombe State and other neighbouring states.

They were labeled "G1" in Joseph Greenberg's Adamawa language-family proposal and later placed in a Waja–Jen branch of that family.

Guldemann (2018) observes significant internal lexical diversity within Tula-Waja, partly as a result of word tabooing accelerating lexical change. Although noun classes have been lost in Dadiya, Maa, and Yebu, Waja and Tula retain complex noun class systems. Kleinewillinghöfer (1996) also observes many morphological similarities between the Tula–Waja and Central Gur languages, a view shared by Bennett (1983) and Bennett & Sterk (1977).

Languages
Awak: Awak (Yebu), Kamo
Cham–Mona: Dijim-Bwilim, Tso
Dadiya
Tula: Bangwinji, Tula, Waja

Classification
Ulrich Kleinewillinghöfer (2014), in the Adamawa Languages Project website, classifies the Tula–Waja languages as follows. Kleinewillinghöfer considers Tso and Cham to be branches that had diverged earlier. Waja is considered by Kleinewillinghöfer to be a distinct branch, although its exact position within Tula-Waja remains uncertain.
Tula–Waja
Core Tula group
Tula
Kutule
Wange
Baule
Yiri (Yili)
Dadiya (local variants)
Bangwinji
Kaalo
Naabaŋ
Yebu (Awak) (local variants)
Ma (Kamo, Kamu)
Cham
Dijim of Kindiyo
Bwilim (of Mɔna and Loojaa)
Tso (Lotsu-Piri)
Tso of the Swaabou
Tso of the Bərbou
Tso of the Gusubo
Tso of Luuzo
Waja
Waja of Wɩɩ (Wajan Kasa) (local variants)
Waja of Deri (Wajan Dutse) (two variants)

Names and locations
Below is a list of language names, populations, and locations from Blench (2019).

See also
Tula-Waja word lists (Wiktionary)

References

External links
 Tula-Wiyaa languages – Blench
Tula-Waja - Adamawa Languages Project 
Tula-Waja comparative wordlist (Swadesh 100)
Tula-Waja pronouns and numbers

 
Adamawa languages